Holth is a surname. Notable people with the surname include:

Åsta Holth (1904–1999), Norwegian novelist, poet and short story writer
Camilla Holth (born 1978), Norwegian curler
Halfdan Holth (1880–1950), Norwegian veterinarian
Marie Spångberg Holth (1865–1942), Norwegian physician
Sverre Holth (1902–1993), Norwegian missionary in China
Thorleif Holth (1931–2014), Norwegian politician